Saxton Oval, also known as Saxton Field, is a cricket ground in Saxton, Stoke, Nelson Region, New Zealand.  Saxton Oval was one of the venues for the 2015 Cricket World Cup. It hosted three matches during the tournament.

History

The ground was constructed by the Nelson Cricket Association following their move from Trafalgar Park, at a cost of $3.8 million.  The Oval is part of a wider sports complex which also offers athletics, association football, field hockey and softball facilities.

The ground was first used by Central Districts in a Twenty20 match in the 2009–10 HRV Cup against Canterbury.  Three further Twenty20 matches were played there in that competition.  The ground held its first List A and first-class matches in the 2011-12 Ford Trophy and the 2011-12 Plunket Shield.  A single Women's Twenty20 International was played there in December 2010 between New Zealand Women and Australia Women.  

The cricket oval was used as a base during the 2011 Rugby Union World Cup by the national teams of Italy and Australia.   

Saxton Oval was one of the venues for the 2015 Cricket World Cup.

On 4 January 2014, Nelson hosted its first men's one day international match when West Indies played New Zealand.

On 29 December 2017, Nelson hosted its first men's T20 international match when West Indies played New Zealand.

International Centuries
The following centuries have been achieved at the ground.

ODIs

References

External links
Saxton Oval at ESPNcricinfo
Saxton Oval at CricketArchive

2009 establishments in New Zealand
Cricket grounds in New Zealand
Softball venues in New Zealand
Association football venues in New Zealand
Sports venues in the Nelson Region
2015 Cricket World Cup stadiums